Mario Alejandro Ruíz Díaz (born January 12, 1977, in Morelia, Michoacán) is a former Mexican footballer and defender. He last played for Club León. He started his career in 1997 with Morelia, where he became a symbol. In 2003, he was transferred to Tigres.

Honours

Club
Morelia
Mexican Primera División: Invierno 2000

References

External links
 

1977 births
Living people
Atlético Morelia players
Tigres UANL footballers
Club León footballers
Sportspeople from Morelia
Footballers from Michoacán
Mexican footballers
Association football defenders
Liga MX players